The Mediterranean Expeditionary Force (MEF) was the part of the British Army during World War I  that commanded all Allied forces at Gallipoli and Salonika. It was formed in March 1915, under the command of General Sir Ian Hamilton, at the beginning of the Gallipoli campaign of the First World War.

History 
The Mediterranean Expeditionary Force included the initial naval operation to force the straits of the Dardanelles.  Its headquarters was formed in March 1915. The MEF was originally commanded by General Sir Ian Hamilton until he was dismissed due to the failure of the 29th Division at Gallipoli.  Command briefly passed to General William Birdwood, commander of the Australian and New Zealand Army Corps, but for the duration of the Gallipoli campaign it was General Sir Charles Monro who led the MEF.

While the Gallipoli theatre was the only active Mediterranean theatre, the MEF was used to refer to the forces at Gallipoli. With the opening of the Salonika front in October 1915, the forces at Gallipoli were referred to as the Dardanelles Army and the Salonika contingent became the Salonika Army on the Macedonian front (World War I).

Once Salonika became the sole Mediterranean theatre the MEF was commanded by General Archibald Murray who was based in Egypt and whose command also involved defence of the Suez Canal from Turkish attacks.  As the importance of the Sinai front grew, a separate headquarters called the Egyptian Expeditionary Force was formed (in March 1916).

Supposedly when the British Secretary of State for War, Lord Kitchener, was preparing the Mediterranean expedition he intended to name the headquarters the Constantinople Expeditionary Force but Hamilton suggested this might be a bit of a giveaway, and also noted in his diary, "I begged him to alter this to avert Fate's evil eye."

See also
 Order of battle for the Gallipoli Campaign
 Gallipoli campaign
 Dardanelles Army

References

External links
  Parliamentary debates of 19 October 1915  in Hansard

Expeditionary units and formations
Commands of the British Army
Field armies of the United Kingdom
Field armies of the United Kingdom in World War I
Military units and formations of the British Army in World War I
Egypt in World War I
Middle Eastern theatre of World War I
World War I orders of battle
Military units and formations established in 1915
Military units and formations disestablished in 1916